Highlandtown is an unincorporated community in eastern Washington Township, Columbiana County, Ohio. It is immediately south of Highlandtown Lake, a reservoir which takes its name.

History
Highlandtown was originally built up chiefly by settlers of Scottish ancestry.  The name Highlandtown is derived from the Scottish Highlands. The post office at Highlandtown was called Inverness, as there was already a Highlandtown post office at the time. The Inverness post office was established in 1838, and remained in operation until 1902, and the community reverted to Highlandtown.

References

Unincorporated communities in Columbiana County, Ohio
1838 establishments in Ohio
Populated places established in 1838
Unincorporated communities in Ohio